Kate Denborough is a choreographer, artistic director, CEO and co-founder of Kage Physical Theatre. She has directed, devised and/or performed in most of KAGE's works as well as working with other companies such as Chunky Move, Australian Dance Theatre and Tasdance, through which she has been nominated for and won various awards such as Canberra Critics Circle Award for Dance. She is also a member of the Malthouse Artistic Counsel.

Personal life
Denborough was born in 1974 and received schooling at the Victorian College of the Arts in Melbourne in 1994 with a Bachelor of Dance. While at university in 1992 she met Gerard Van Dyck.

KAGE
In 1996, Kate and Gerard Van Dyck co-founded KAGE, naming it after her and Gerard (Kate, Gerard). To date, KAGE has created 20 works. As of its 17th, Denborough had taken part in all of them through devising, directing and/or performing. Today she is the CEO and artistic director of KAGE.

Awards
Denborough's awards and nominations include:

Canberra Critics Circle Award for Dance
Green Room Award for Female Emerging Artist in Dance
Joint winner of the Eva Czajor memorial Award, an award for female directors
The Paris residency at the Cite Internationale des Arts in 2001
Listed in the 2013 Westpac Group 100 Women of Influence Awards
Nomination for Australian Dance Award for Outstanding Performance by a Female Dancer

Shows
 Kage (1997), shown at now-defunct Budinski's Theatre, Melbourne
 Contamination (1998), shown at the Next Wave Festival
 Asphyxiate (1998)
 No (Under)Standing Anytime (2000), shown at the Next Wave Festival
 This Side Up (2000)
 2 Without Spine (2000)
 Collapsible Man (2001)
 Misfit (2001)
 Birthday (2002)
 Underground (2002)
 Nowhere Man (2003), shown at Melbourne International Arts Festival
 The day the world turned upside down (2004)
 Al Fresco (2006) shown at Melbourne Cultural Festival for the Commonwealth Games
 Headlock (2006), shown at the Malthouse
 Ink (2006)
 Possessed (2007), Denborough directed
 Appetite (2008), shown at the 2008 Melbourne International Festival of the Arts
 Pink Lines (2008), Denborough choreographed for Tasdance
 Look Right Through Me (2011)
 Sundowner (2011), Denborough directed in partnership with Alzheimer's Australia Vic,
 Wildlife (2013)
 Flesh & Bone (2013)
 Team of Life (2014)
 Forklift (2014)

Denborough has worked collaboratively outside of KAGE with Australian Dance Theatre, Tasdance, Weave, compaignie par.b.leax (Montreal), and Victorian College of the Arts.

References 

Australian choreographers
1973 births
Living people
Australian women chief executives
Australian women company founders
Australian company founders